David Haugh (born May 22, 1968) is an American columnist, radio, and television personality. Haugh worked with the Chicago Tribune from 2002 to 2020, serving as the primary Chicago Bears columnist since 2009.

In July 2018, Haugh replaced Brian Hanley as the host of Mully & Hanley on WSCR. He joined retained host Mike Mulligan on the newly branded Mully & Haugh.

Education
Haugh was raised in North Judson, Indiana. He obtained his degree from Ball State University, where he played football and was an All-Mid-American Conference safety and Academic All-American. He later received his master's degree from the Medill School of Journalism at Northwestern University.

Career
Haugh worked for the South Bend Tribune starting in 1993, primarily covering Notre Dame football. In February 2003, Haugh began working for the Chicago Tribune. He began as the beat writer and later columnist for the Chicago Bears. In 2009, he became the Chicago Tribunes 17th "In the Wake of the News" columnist. On January 28, 2020, Haugh was fired from the Chicago Tribune after 17 years with the newspaper.

Haugh was also the co-host of the now-defunct "Kap and Haugh Show," which aired on Comcast SportsNet Chicago and WGN Plus. He partnered with longtime Chicago sports broadcaster David Kaplan on the program from 9 am-noon on weekdays. Haugh is also a regular post-game contributor on Chicago SportsTalk Live on NBC Sports Chicago following Bears games.

Awards and honors
Haugh has received several locals, state, and national writing awards. He was chosen as the 1999 Indiana Sportswriter of the Year by the National Sportscasters and Sportswriters Association.

Family
He is married to his wife Allison, a yoga instructor. Together they have a son named Blair and two dogs, Ashton and Bear.

References

Sportswriters from Illinois
Chicago Tribune people
Living people
1968 births
20th-century American journalists
American male journalists